António Ferreira Carvalho (born 25 October 1989) is a Portuguese cyclist, who currently rides for UCI Continental team .

Major results

2012
 2nd Road race, National Road Championships
 7th Overall Volta ao Alentejo
 8th Overall Troféu Joaquim Agostinho
2013
 1st  Overall Volta a Portugal do Futuro
1st Stage 5
 10th Overall Volta ao Alentejo
1st Stage 5
2014
 1st  Mountains classification Volta a Portugal
 9th Overall Vuelta a Castilla y León
2015
 6th Overall Volta a Portugal
2016
 4th Overall Volta Internacional Cova da Beira
 8th Overall Vuelta a Asturias
2017
 6th Overall Volta a Portugal
 7th Overall Vuelta a Castilla y León
2018
 4th Overall Troféu Joaquim Agostinho
2019
 National Road Championships
3rd Road race
3rd Time trial
 4th Overall Volta a Portugal
1st Stage 9
2020
1st Stage 7 Volta a Portugal
2021
 8th Overall Volta a Portugal

References

External links

1989 births
Living people
Portuguese male cyclists